XO Communications, LLC (previously Nextlink Communications, Concentric Network Corporation and Allegiance Telecom, Inc.) was an American telecommunications company. Before being purchased by and later absorbed by Verizon Communications. XO provided managed and converged Internet Protocol (IP) network services for small and medium-sized enterprises. XO delivered services through a mix of fiber-based Ethernet and Ethernet over Copper (EoC). In addition, the company had external network-to-network interface (E-NNI) agreements with traditional carriers and cable companies.

Acquisition by Verizon Communications
In a news release dated February 22, 2016, Verizon announced plans to acquire XO Communications' "fiber-optic network business." In 2017, Verizon completed its $1.8 billion acquisition of XO Communications. As of summer 2020 all XO services have been migrated to Verizon.

References

Companies based in Fairfax County, Virginia
Telecommunications companies of the United States
Transit-free networks
Telecommunications companies established in 1996
American companies established in 1996
1996 establishments in Washington (state)
Herndon, Virginia
Verizon Communications acquisitions
2017 mergers and acquisitions